The Future Now Tour was a co-headlining concert tour by American singers Demi Lovato and Nick Jonas. It was Lovato's fifth headlining tour, in support of her fifth studio album Confident (2015), and Jonas' third concert tour, in support of his third studio album Last Year Was Complicated (2016). The co-headlining tour started on June 29, 2016, in Atlanta and ended on September 17, 2016, in Inglewood, California. Lovato continued the tour as a solo headlining act on September 24, 2016 in New York City, and the tour concluded in Monterrey on October 19, 2016.

Background and development

On October 26, 2015, Lovato and Jonas announced on the Elvis Duran Show after days of rumors that they would go on tour together. On the same day, she talked about the tour on Good Morning America. It was also announced that the tickets would go on sale on November 7, 2015. The poster for the tour was revealed as well and it has been described as very "Hunger Games tributes representing District 1.″

On March 22, 2016, the tour was officially announced as a part of the 15th Annual Honda Civic Tour. Fans were given the chance to enter the 2016 Honda Civic Tour Sweepstakes for a chance to win one of three grand prizes: a 2016 Honda Civic Sedan automobile customized by Lovato, a Honda Grom motorcycle customized by Jonas, and a trip for two to Los Angeles to see Lovato and Jonas live in concert at The Forum. On June 28, 2016, it was announced that Tidal would livestream the first date of the tour. On June 29, 2016, Lovato announced that CAST Centers would join her on tour to promote open dialogue about mental health and wellness, also to inspire fans and erase the stigma around asking for help.

The Honda Civic Tour of the Future Now Tour took place in North America across the United States and Canada from June 29, 2016 until September 17, 2016. Mike Posner served as the main opening act with the exceptions of Atlanta, Sunrise, Orlando, San Jose, Portland, and Seattle. Rich Homie Quan and Migos opened in Atlanta, Marshmello opened in Sunrise, DJ JayR opened in Orlando, and Chord Overstreet opened in Chula Vista, San Jose, Nashville, and Inglewood. Lovato and Jonas were scheduled to perform Charlotte and Raleigh, but cancelled over the HB2 law in North Carolina. Lovato and Jonas was also scheduled to perform in Virginia Beach, but cancelled due to a scheduling conflict with the Boston Pops Firework Spectacular July 4.

Lovato continued the Future Now Tour without Jonas in New York City, Turkey, and Mexico. On September 7, 2016, Global Citizen Festival 2016 announced Lovato as a headliner of the festival in New York City. Selena Gomez was an original headliner, but cancelled due to anxiety and depression caused by lupus. On September 21, 2016 Expo 2016 announced Lovato as a headliner of the festival in Antalya. The tour concluded in Mexico with three shows in Mexico City, Guadalajara, and Monterrey.

Set list 
{{Hidden
| headercss = background: #CECEF2; font-size: 100%; width: 100%;  
| contentcss = text-align: left; font-size: 100%; width: 100%; 
| header = Jonas and Lovato
| content =
This set list is representative of the Atlanta performance on June 29, 2016. It is not representative of all concerts for the duration of the tour.

"Levels"†
"Champagne Problems"†
"Teacher"†
"Good Thing"†
"The Difference"†
"Bacon"†
"Numb"†
"Chains"†
"Confident"‡
"Heart Attack"‡
"Neon Lights"‡ 
"For You"‡
"Body Say" ‡
"Fix a Heart"‡
"Nightingale"‡
"Warrior"‡
"Lionheart"‡
"Give Your Heart a Break"‡
"Stone Cold"
"Chainsaw"†
"Jealous"†
"Close"
"Skyscraper"‡
Encore
"Cool for the Summer"‡

}}

{{Hidden
| headercss = background: #CECEF2; font-size: 100%; width: 100%;  
| contentcss = text-align: left; font-size: 100%; width: 100%; 
| header = Lovato only
| content =
This set list is representative of the Montreal performance on July 22, 2016. It is not representative of all concerts for the duration of the tour.

"Confident"
"Heart Attack"
"Neon Lights"
"Fire Starter"
"For You"
"Got Dynamite"
"Body Say"
"Wildfire"
"My Love Is like a Star"
"Fix a Heart"
"Nightingale"
"Warrior"
"Lionheart"
"Old Ways"
"Kingdom Come"
"Yes"
"Stone Cold"
"Give Your Heart a Break"
"Skyscraper"
Encore
 "Cool for the Summer"

}}

Shows

Cancelled shows

Notes

References

External links
 

Demi Lovato concert tours
Nick Jonas concert tours
2016 concert tours
Co-headlining concert tours